Pometia may refer to:

 Suessa Pometia, an ancient Roman city
 Pometia (plant), a genus of plants in the maple family
 Pometia pinnata, a species of Pometia